James Cook (born 12 May 1959) Jamaican born, a former European and British super middleweight boxing champion. In 2007, he was awarded an MBE for "his outstanding work with the young people of Hackney's notorious Murder Mile". He also previously featured on the show The Secret Millionaire.

His nephew, Reice Charles-Cook, is a goalkeeper for Macclesfield Town and regularly featured in former club Arsenal's under-18 side.

References

External links
 
 

1959 births
Living people
British male boxers
Jamaican male boxers
World super-middleweight boxing champions
Members of the Order of the British Empire
Jamaican emigrants to the United Kingdom